The proper plantar digital arteries are arteries of the foot.

See also
 Proper plantar digital nerves of medial plantar nerve
 Proper plantar digital nerves of lateral plantar nerve

External links
 http://www.dartmouth.edu/~humananatomy/figures/chapter_17/17-3.HTM

Arteries of the lower limb